This is a list of software that blocks pop-up ads.

Browsers that block pop-up ads 
Trident shells
AOL Explorer
Avant Browser
GreenBrowser
Internet Explorer
Lunascape
Maxthon
MSN Explorer
NeoPlanet
Netcaptor
Netscape 8
Sleipnir

Gecko-based browsers
Camino
Epiphany 
Flock
Galeon 
K-Meleon
Lunascape
Mozilla Application Suite
Mozilla Firefox
Netscape 7
Netscape 8 
SeaMonkey

KHTML/WebKit-based browsers
Brave
Google Chrome
iCab
Konqueror
Lunascape
OmniWeb
Safari
Shiira

Presto-based browsers
Opera

Others
Links
NetSurf
w3m

Add-on programs that block pop-up ads
Privoxy
Proxomitron

Browser extensions
Adblock Plus
AdBlock
Adguard
Alexa Toolbar
Bing Bar
Google Toolbar
Ghostery
IE7pro
iMacros
NoScript—open source (GPL)
uBlock Origin
Yahoo! Toolbar

References

Web browsers
Software add-ons
Software by type
Online advertising
Lists of software
Internet privacy software
Ad blocking software